Köroğlu is a Turkish name, and it may refer to:

Given name
Koroglu Rahimov (1953–1992), national hero of Azerbaijan

Surname
Abdülkadir Köroğlu (born 1991), Turkish amateur boxer 
Elif Köroğlu, Turkish female football referee
Hüseyin Köroğlu (born 1964), Turkish Cypriot actor

Places
Köroğlu Mountains, mountain range situated in the northern Turkey, north of Ankara
 Köroğlu, Şenkaya
Köroğlu, Zonguldak, a village in Zonguldak District, Zonguldak Province, Turkey

other uses
Epic of Koroghlu, heroic legend prominent in the oral traditions of the Turkic peoples
Koroğlu, semi-mystical hero and bard among the Turkic people